Acanthocobitis (Paracanthocobitis) canicula also known as the houndstooth zipper loach is a species of ray-finned fish in the genus, or subgenus, Paracanthocobitis. This species is known from the lower Mekong basin of Cambodia.

References

canicula
Fish described in 2015
Taxa named by Randal Anthony Singer
Taxa named by Lawrence M. Page